The Pheasant Rump Nakota First Nation is a First Nation in the Canadian province of Saskatchewan, who reside on the Pheasant Rump Nakota 68 reserve near Kisbey. This band government contains three nations, which are Nakoda.

Signatories to Treaty 4 in 1876, the First Nation's reserve was established in 1881.

The main community on the reserve lands is Warmley.

Gallery 
Gallery of photos from Warmley, Saskatchewan.

References

First Nations in Saskatchewan